Box Hill High School is a co-educational public secondary school located on the corner of Middleborough Road and Whitehorse Road in the eastern suburb of Box Hill in Melbourne, Victoria, Australia.

With an enrolment of 1380 students, it caters for students from years 7 through to 12. Year 10, 11 and 12 students undertake the VCE program.

Its school zone includes the suburbs of Box Hill, Box Hill South, Burwood, Burwood East Blackburn, Blackburn North, and Blackburn South.

History

Established in 1930 as a single-sex boys school, Box Hill High School is now a co-educational school. In 2007-2009, a large upgrade of the facilities, funded by the Victorian State Government, was undertaken; these upgrades included the creation of a number of new classrooms, a new gym, library, numerous computer labs and the refurbishment of existing science classrooms.. In 2020-2021, the school again received an upgrade, with a number of new classrooms completed by mid-2021, as well as being awarded $500,000 by the Victorian State Government to refurbish staff and student toilets.

Academics
Box Hill High School was ranked in the top 200 public secondary schools (equal 3rd) in Australia based on academic results in 2009.

In 2014, the Victorian Certificate of Education median study score was 33. 12.3% percent of students achieved over 40 study scores.

Box Hill High School was ranked ninth out of all state secondary schools in Victoria based on VCE results in 2018.

Box Hill High School was one of 40 government schools in Victoria that ran the Select Entry Accelerated Learning Program (SEAL), until the program was ended state-wide by the Victorian Department of Education in 2016.

Notable alumni
Graeme Base - author and picture book artist
Ian Browne - cyclist
George Cox - politician
Bob Greig, politician
Venky Jois, basketballer
Tony Lamb - politician
Jordan Ridley - AFL footballer
John Sangster - musician

Notable staff
George Furner Langley - soldier
Bill Woodfull - cricketer

References

External links
 
 Faculty of Engineering Technology Website

Educational institutions established in 1930
Public high schools in Melbourne
1930 establishments in Australia